The 2006 NCAA Division I Women's Golf Championships were contested at the 25th annual NCAA-sanctioned golf tournament to determine the individual and team national champions of women's Division I collegiate golf in the United States.

The tournament was held at the Ohio State University Golf Club in Columbus, Ohio.

Defending champions Duke again won the team championship, the Blue Devils' fourth.

Dewi Schreefel, from USC, won the individual title.

Qualification
Three regional qualifying tournaments were held across the United States from May 11–13, 2006.
The eight teams with the lowest team scores qualified from each regional tournament.

 ^ = Teams listed in qualifying order.
 Debut appearance

Results

Individual champion
 Dewi Schreefel, USC (286, −2)

Team leaderboard

 DC = Defending champion

References

NCAA Women's Golf Championship
Golf in Ohio
NCAA Women's Golf Championship
NCAA Women's Golf Championship
NCAA Women's Golf Championship